The 2014 Brasil Tennis Cup was a women's tennis tournament played on outdoor hard courts. It was the 2nd edition of the Brasil Tennis Cup, in the International category of the 2014 WTA Tour. It took place in Florianópolis, Brazil, from February 23 through March 1, 2014.

Points and prize money

Point distribution

Prize money

Singles main-draw entrants

Seeds 

 Rankings are as of February 17, 2014.

Other entrants 
The following players received wildcards into the singles main draw:
  Gabriela Cé
  Paula Cristina Gonçalves
  Beatriz Haddad Maia

The following player received entry as a special exempt:
  Teliana Pereira

The following players received entry from the qualifying draw:
  Alexandra Dulgheru
  Mariana Duque Mariño
  Sesil Karatantcheva
  Danka Kovinić
  Alizé Lim
  Alison Van Uytvanck

Retirements 
  Alexandra Dulgheru (lower back injury)
  Monica Niculescu (right foot injury)

Doubles main-draw entrants

Seeds 

 Rankings are as of February 17, 2014.

Other entrants 
The following pairs received wildcards into the doubles main draw:
  Maria Fernanda Alves /  Beatriz Haddad Maia
  Paula Cristina Gonçalves /  Laura Pigossi

The following pair received entry as alternates:
  Julia Glushko /  Paula Kania

Withdrawals 
Before the tournament
  Klára Zakopalová (viral chest infection)

Champions

Singles 

  Klára Zakopalová def.  Garbiñe Muguruza, 4–6, 7–5, 6–0

Doubles 

  Anabel Medina Garrigues /  Yaroslava Shvedova def.  Francesca Schiavone /  Sílvia Soler Espinosa, 7–6(7–1), 2–6, [10–3]

External links 
 Official website

Brasil Tennis Cup
Brasil Tennis Cup
2014 in Brazilian tennis